Matthew Luke Penney (born 11 February 1998) is an English professional footballer who plays for Charlton Athletic, on loan from Ipswich Town, as a full back or midfielder.

Penney joined Sheffield Wednesday in 2006, progressing through the club's academy to make his senior debut in August 2018. During his time at Sheffield Wednesday, he spent time out on loan at Bradford City, Mansfield Town and FC St. Pauli. He signed for Ipswich Town in June 2021.

Career

Sheffield Wednesday
Born in Chesterfield, Penney began his career with Sheffield Wednesday at the age of eight years old, progressing through the club's academy and turning professional in October 2015.

He signed on loan for Bradford City on transfer deadline day, 31 January 2017, alongside Charlie Wyke, Jacob Hanson and Kevin Toner. He made his professional debut on 30 April 2017, appearing as a substitute in the last game of the regular 2016–17 season against Rochdale.

Penney signed on loan for Mansfield Town on transfer deadline day, 31 January 2018. He made his debut on 10 February against Swindon Town. Penny made 2 substitute appearances during his loan spell with Mansfield.

He made his first-team debut for Sheffield Wednesday on 16 August 2018, coming on as a second-half substitute in a 2–0 win against Sunderland in the EFL Cup. He made his league debut in the following match on 19 August against Brentford. He made 17 appearances during his first full season in the Sheffield Wednesday first-team.

In August 2019 he moved on loan to German side FC St. Pauli. He was sent-off on his St. Pauli debut on 26 August 2019 against Holstein Kiel. He scored his first senior goal on 22 February 2020, netting the second goal in a 2–0 win against Hamburger SV in the Hamburg derby. He made 18 appearances during his time on loan with St. Pauli, scoring once.

On 4 June 2020, he signed a new one-year contract at Sheffield Wednesday, keeping him with the club until the end of the 2020–21 season. He made his first appearance of the 2020–21 season on 5 September against Walsall. Penny made 15 appearances in all competitions during the season.

On 20 May 2021 it was announced that he would leave Sheffield Wednesday at the end of the season, following the expiry of his contract.

Ipswich Town
On 29 June 2021, Penney joined Ipswich Town on a free transfer, signing a two-year deal with the option of an additional years' extension.

On 25 August 2022, Penney joined Scottish Premiership side Motherwell on a six-month loan deal. he returned to Ipswich in January 2023 after the expiry of his loan.

Charlton Athletic (loan)
On 21 January 2023, Penney joined Charlton Athletic on loan until the end of the 2022–23 season.

Style of play
Primarily an attacking full back, Penney can also play as a wing back and as a midfielder.

Career statistics

References

External links

1998 births
Living people
English footballers
Association football fullbacks
Association football midfielders
Sheffield Wednesday F.C. players
Bradford City A.F.C. players
Mansfield Town F.C. players
FC St. Pauli players
Ipswich Town F.C. players
Motherwell F.C. players
Charlton Athletic F.C. players
2. Bundesliga players
English expatriate footballers
English expatriates in Germany
Expatriate footballers in Germany
Scottish Professional Football League players